The 11th Critics' Choice Awards were presented on January 9, 2006, honoring the finest achievements of 2005 filmmaking. The ceremony was held at the Santa Monica Civic Auditorium in Santa Monica, California.

Top 10 films
(in alphabetical order)

 Brokeback Mountain
 Capote
 Cinderella Man
 The Constant Gardener
 Crash
 Good Night, and Good Luck
 King Kong
 Memoirs of a Geisha
 Munich
 Walk the Line

Winners and nominees

Freedom Award
George Clooney – Good Night, and Good Luck

Best Picture Made for Television
Into the West
 No Direction Home
 Rome (for episode "The Stolen Eagle")
 Warm Springs

Distinguished Achievement in Performing Arts Award
King Kong – King Kong

Statistics

References

Broadcast Film Critics Association Awards
2005 film awards